Köksalmanack is a Swedish combined almanac-cookbook. Since 1933 it has been published every year.

The earlier title, Husmoderns köksalmanack, was dropped in 1979.

References

1933 establishments in Sweden
Almanacs
Series of non-fiction books
Swedish cookbooks